Angel with the Sword is a science fantasy novel by American writer C. J. Cherryh, published in 1985 by DAW Books. It is set in Cherryh's Alliance–Union universe, and is the first book in the shared universe Merovingen Nights.

Reception
Dave Langford reviewed Angel with the Sword for White Dwarf #91, and stated that "it zips smartly along to an inconclusive ending on p250: the last fifty pages are superfluous appendices, maps, etc, indicating not merely a sequel but considerable cheek".

References

External links
 
 Angel with the Sword at Fantastic Fiction

1985 American novels
1985 science fiction novels
American science fiction novels
DAW Books books
Novels set in the future
Science fiction novels by C. J. Cherryh